Anne Marie McCaffrey (born 7 August 1955) is a Canadian former swimmer. She competed in the women's 400 metre freestyle at the 1972 Summer Olympics.

References

External links
 
 
 

1955 births
Living people
Canadian female swimmers
Olympic swimmers of Canada
Swimmers at the 1972 Summer Olympics
Sportspeople from Thunder Bay
Canadian female freestyle swimmers
20th-century Canadian women
21st-century Canadian women